John M. de Castro is an American psychologist who served as founding Dean of the College of Humanities and Social Sciences at Sam Houston State University from 2006 to 2013. Previously, he had served as professor and chair of the Department of Psychology at the University of Texas at El Paso, where he had begun teaching in August 2003. Prior to that, from 1974 to August 2003, he taught at Georgia State University. Much of his research is focused on eating behavior in humans. He received the 11th John M. Kinney Award for Nutrition and Metabolism in recognition of his research.

References

Living people
Northeastern University alumni
University of Massachusetts alumni
Sam Houston State University faculty
University of Texas at El Paso faculty
Georgia State University faculty
Year of birth missing (living people)